This article presents detailed opinion polling for the 2012 Hong Kong legislative election.

Overall poll results
Overall poll results each party in geographical constituencies according to each constituency.

Seat projection
Seats gained by each party in geographical constituencies according to the opinion polling.

Opinion polls by constituency

Hong Kong Island 
Key:  Pro-democrats secured;  Pro-Beijing secured.

Kowloon East 
Key:  Pro-democrats secured;  Pro-Beijing secured.

Kowloon West 

Key:  Pro-democrats secured;  Pro-Beijing secured.

New Territories East 
Key:  Pro-democrats secured;  Pro-Beijing secured.

New Territories West 
Key:  Pro-democrats secured;  Pro-Beijing secured.

District Council (Second)
This chart presents detailed opinion polling for the 2012 Hong Kong legislative election in District Council (Second).

Key:  Pro-democrats secured;  Pro-Beijing secured.

See also
 Opinion polling for the Hong Kong legislative election, 2008
 Opinion polling for the Hong Kong legislative election, 2016

2012 Hong Kong legislative election
Legislative
Hong Kong